Stanley Humphrey Huntington (17 April 1889 – 13 April 1980) was an Australian rules footballer who played with Melbourne in the Victorian Football League (VFL).

He had two brothers Les and Jack who also played VFL football.

Notes

External links 

1889 births
Australian rules footballers from Melbourne
Melbourne Football Club players
Essendon Association Football Club players
1980 deaths
People from South Yarra, Victoria